Empire of the Undead is the eleventh studio album by German power metal band Gamma Ray, released on 28 March 2014. It was their first album to feature new drummer Michael Ehré following Dan Zimmermann's departure in 2012.

Background
Kai Hansen revealed in an interview with Metal Blast in April 2013 that their upcoming album, Empire of the Undead, to be released in 2014, would have a "more thrashy" sound. In the same interview, Dirk Schlächter announced that the band would do a headlining tour following its release, in March or April 2014.

Track listing
Credits via the album's liner notes.

Charts

References

External links
Empire of the Undead album release, from Gamma Ray's website

2014 albums
Gamma Ray (band) albums
Edel AG albums